Basnayake Shalith Malinda Warnapura (born 26 May 1979), or Malinda Warnapura, is a former professional Sri Lankan cricketer, who played in 14 Test matches and three One Day Internationals. He is a left-handed batsman and right-arm off-break bowler. He is the current coach of St Peter's College, Colombo. He is the nephew of former Sri Lankan cricket captain Bandula Warnapura and the cousin of cricketer Madawa Warnapura.

Domestic career
Making his first class debut in 1998/99, Warnapura did not play international cricket for Sri Lanka until 2007. He had however previously represented them in the cricket tournament at the 1998 Commonwealth Games. He made his highest first class score of 242 playing for Sri Lanka A against Bangladesh A in 2007.

International career
Malinda made his ODI debut on 20 May 2007 against Bangladesh, and Test debut at the same series, on 25 June 2007. Malinda scored his first Test century in his third Test, where he scored 120 runs in the first innings against West Indies. Despite his aggressive shots as an opening batsman with Michael Vandort, and in late with Tharanga Paranavitana, he was dropped from the team after Pakistan series in 2009. Then he was never called to the team in both Tests and ODIs. Until his doors were closed to the international arena, Malinda played 14 Tests with 2 centuries and 3 ODIs. He is now acting as a television commentator for sports as well as playing domestic cricket.

References

External links

1979 births
Living people
Sri Lankan cricketers
Sri Lanka One Day International cricketers
Sri Lanka Test cricketers
Basnahira South cricketers
Burgher Recreation Club cricketers
Colts Cricket Club cricketers
Colombo Cricket Club cricketers
Cricketers at the 1998 Commonwealth Games
Alumni of St. Peter's College, Colombo
Basnahira cricketers
Chilaw Marians Cricket Club cricketers
Khelaghar Samaj Kallyan Samity cricketers
Commonwealth Games competitors for Sri Lanka